Epifanio González Chaves (born January 19, 1958) is a former Paraguayan football referee. He is known for supervising two matches in the 1998 FIFA World Cup in France. Footballer Gabriel González is his brother.

He is also a referee analyst for Tiro Directo presented by Luis Enrique Perez and Solo Fútbol presented by Mario Ramírez.

External links 
Epifanio González at WorldFootball.net

1958 births
Paraguayan football referees
FIFA World Cup referees
Copa América referees
1998 FIFA World Cup referees
Living people